Anthony Jon Barry (born 29 May 1986) is an English professional football coach and former player who is assistant coach for Premier League club Chelsea and the Portugal national football team.

Career
He signed for Everton as a trainee and when released signed up with Coventry City where he was a regular in the reserves. He joined Accrington Stanley in 2005, and was an ever-present for the first half of the 2005–06 season, making 26 Conference appearances as the side headed for promotion back to The Football League. In January 2006 he joined Yeovil Town.

Barry made 64 league appearances for the Glovers, before being released in May 2008. This stint included an appearance at Wembley Stadium in the Football League One play–off final against Blackpool in 2006–07. He scored his only goal for Yeovil in a 2–1 defeat at Shrewsbury Town in the Football League Trophy on 31 October 2006.

On 19 June 2008, Barry signed a two-year contract with Chester City. He went on to feature in 43 of Chester's 46 league games during their relegation season from Football League Two, with his only goal being a spectacular long-range effort against Lincoln City in January 2009. His contract with Chester was terminated on 11 January 2010 with immediate notice. He signed for Wrexham on an 18-month deal on 16 January, but left the club less than one week later after asking to be released from his contract. On 24 January 2010 he signed for Conference North side Fleetwood Town, after being offered three times the amount he was paid with Wrexham. This move angered Wrexham's manager, Dean Saunders. He was named in the Conference Team of the Year for the 2010–11 season after Fleetwood reached the play-off semi-finals.
It was announced on 7 May 2013, that Fleetwood would not be offering the midfielder a new contract, and would therefore be released.

In May 2013, he joined Forest Green Rovers on a three-year deal. He made his debut for the club on 10 August 2013 in an 8–0 win against Hyde at The New Lawn. He scored his first goal for the club on 17 August 2013 in an away defeat against Lincoln City. On 8 October 2014, having failed to make an appearance in the 2014–15 season for Forest Green, he re-joined League Two club Accrington Stanley on a 93-day loan. In January 2015, the loan deal was extended until the end of the season.

On 7 June 2016, Barry signed for National League side Wrexham. Barry was released by Wrexham at the end of the 2016–17 season.

Coaching
In the summer of 2020, Barry joined Chelsea as first-team coach after three years assisting Paul Cook at Wigan Athletic. In February 2021, he replaced the departed Damien Duff in Stephen Kenny's Republic of Ireland coaching team.
He combined the role at Chelsea with the part-time role with the Republic of Ireland. In February 2022 , Barry left the Irish set-up to join Belgium’s coaching team. He cited coaching the world's no. 1 ranked team and the opportunity to compete at the World Cup as his motivation for leaving Ireland and joining the Belgians.

Career statistics

Honours
Accrington Stanley
Conference National champion: 2005–06
Yeovil Town
Football League One play-off final runner-up: 2006–07
Fleetwood Town
Conference North play-off winner: 2009–10
Conference National champion: 2011–12
Chelsea FC (as assistant manager)
UEFA Champions League: 2020–21

References

External links

1986 births
Living people
Footballers from Liverpool
English footballers
Association football midfielders
Coventry City F.C. players
Accrington Stanley F.C. players
Yeovil Town F.C. players
Chester City F.C. players
Wrexham A.F.C. players
Fleetwood Town F.C. players
Forest Green Rovers F.C. players
English Football League players
National League (English football) players
Association football coaches
Wigan Athletic F.C. non-playing staff
Chelsea F.C. non-playing staff